Cian Boland (born 1994) is an Irish hurler who plays for Dublin Senior Championship club St. Oliver Plunkett's/Eoghan Ruadh and at inter-county level with the Dublin senior hurling team. He currently lines out as a right corner-forward.

Career

A member of the St. Oliver Plunkett's/Eoghan Ruadh club, Boland first came to prominence on the inter-county scene on the Dublin minor team that won back-to-back Leinster Minor Championships in 2011 and 2012. He subsequently won a Leinster Under-21 Championship with the Dublin under-21 team as well as lining out with DCU Dóchas Éireann in the Fitzgibbon Cup. Boland was still a member of the under-21 team when he was added to the Dublin senior hurling team, making his debut during the 2015 Walsh Cup.

Career statistics

Honours

Dublin 
Leinster Under-21 Hurling Championship: 2016
Leinster Minor Hurling Championship: 2011, 2012

References

External links
Cian Boland profile at the Dublin GAA website

1995 births
Living people
St Oliver Plunketts/Eoghan Ruadh hurlers
Dublin inter-county hurlers